Wabirr is one of the towns located in Bibugn Wereda, East Gojjam Zone, Amhara Region, Ethiopia. It is located at the foot of Choqe mountain.

Populated places in Ethiopia
East Gojjam Zone